Helicops scalaris, the ladder keelback, is a species of snake in the family Colubridae. It is found in Venezuela and Colombia.

References 

Helicops
Snakes of South America
Reptiles of Venezuela
Reptiles of Colombia
Reptiles described in 1865
Taxa named by Giorgio Jan